To constitute India's 16th Lok Sabha, general elections were held in April–May 2014. The result was announced on 16 May 2014. The main contenders were two alliance groups of the Incumbent United Progressive Alliance and the Opposition National Democratic Alliance; led by Indian National Congress and Bharatiya Janata Party respectively.

This article describes the performance of various political parties. For the performance of individual candidates, please see, List of members of the 16th Lok Sabha.

Results by party

Results by Alliance
Vote share of NDA was 38.5% and that of UPA was 23%.

National Democratic Alliance

United Progressive Alliance

Others (Non-Allied)

Results by State

Andaman & Nicobar Islands (1)

Andhra Pradesh (25)

Arunachal Pradesh (2)

Assam (14)

Bihar (40)

Chandigarh (1)

Chhattisgarh (11)

Dadra & Nagar Haveli (1)

Daman & Diu (1)

NCT of Delhi (7)

Goa (2)

Gujarat (26)

Haryana (10)

Himachal Pradesh (4)

Jammu and Kashmir (6)

Jharkhand (14)

Karnataka (28)

Kerala (20)

Lakshadweep (1)

Madhya Pradesh (29)

Maharashtra (48)

Manipur (2)

Meghalaya (2)

Mizoram (1)

Nagaland (1)

Odisha (21)

Puducherry (1)

Punjab (13)

Rajasthan (25)

Sikkim (1)

Tamil Nadu (39)

Telangana (17)

Tripura (2)

Uttar Pradesh (80)

Uttarakhand (5)

West Bengal (42)

Results by constituency

References

2014 Indian general election
Results of general elections in India